Dreamcrash is the second album by Finland-based band Grave Pleasures (formerly known as Beastmilk).

Track listing
 "Utopian Scream" - 03:36
 "New Hip Moon" - 03:07
 "Crying Wolves" - 05:07
 "Futureshock" - 03:13
 "Crisis" - 04:27
 "Worn Threads" - 04:06
 "Taste the Void" - 02:24
 "Lipstick on Your Tombstone" - 03:44
 "Girl in a Vortex" - 03:57
 "Crooked Vein" - 06:08
 "No Survival" - 03:57

Personnel
Linnéa Olsson - guitar player
Juho Vanhanen - guitar player
Mat Kvohst McNerney- lead vocals
Valtteri Arino - bass player
Uno Bruniusson - drummer

References

2015 albums
Grave Pleasures albums
Columbia Records albums
Metal Blade Records albums
Albums produced by Tom Dalgety